Lipatov is a Russian masculine surname originating from the given name Ipat, its feminine counterpart is Lipatova. It may refer to
Alexander Lipatov (born 1981), Russian slalom canoeist
Lev Lipatov (1940–2017), Russian physicist 
Svetlana Lipatova (born 1993), Russian wrestler

References

Russian-language surnames